Eduardo Mendoza Herrera (born 19 May 1993 in Lázaro Cárdenas, Michoacán) is a Mexican professional footballer who plays in the forward position. He is currently on loan at Correcaminos UAT of the Ascenso MX division, from Monarcas Morelia.

References

1993 births
Living people
Footballers from Michoacán
Mexican footballers
People from Lázaro Cárdenas, Michoacán
Association football forwards
Atlético Morelia players